"One Thing at a Time" is a song co-written and recorded by American country music singer Morgan Wallen. Wallen wrote the song wth Ashley Gorley, Ernest Keith Smith, and Ryan Vojtesak, and it was produced by Joey Moi. It is the title track and third single (fourth overall) at country radio from his 2023 album, One Thing at a Time.

Chart performance
"One Thing at a Time" debuted at number two on the Billboard Hot Country Songs chart dated for December 17, 2022, behind Wallen's own "You Proof".

Charts

Release history

Notes

References

2022 songs
2023 singles
Songs written by Morgan Wallen
Songs written by Ashley Gorley
Songs written by Ernest (musician)
Song recordings produced by Joey Moi